Zschokke is a Swiss-German surname. Notable people with the surname include:

Friedrich Zschokke (1860–1936), Swiss zoologist and parasitologist
Heinrich Zschokke (1771–1848), German/Swiss author, historian, and social reformer
Matthias Zschokke (born 1954), Swiss writer and filmmaker

Swiss-German surnames